The Sengstake Building is a building at 310 Northwest Broadway in Portland, Oregon, listed on the National Register of Historic Places. The building was added on October 31, 2012.

See also

 National Register of Historic Places listings in Northwest Portland, Oregon

References

National Register of Historic Places in Portland, Oregon
Northwest Portland, Oregon